Anemone jamesonii is a species of plant in the family Ranunculaceae. It is endemic to Ecuador.

References

Endemic flora of Ecuador
jamesonii
Endangered plants
Taxonomy articles created by Polbot